The Triumph Tiger 900 is a middle-weight dual-sport motorcycle introduced in 2020 by British manufacturer Triumph Motorcycles. While there was a motorcycle called the Triumph Tiger 900 (T400) manufactured from 1993 to 1998, this model is a completely new design intended as a successor of the Triumph Tiger 800 (which it has a similar appearance to).

The Tiger 900's upgrades included a higher-capacity  engine, a larger 5.3-gallon fuel tank, and LED lighting. Additionally, major updates were made to the suspension, and new Brembo disc brakes were added. Rider Magazine described its "T-plane" triple crankshaft as "a first in the motorcycling world, near as we can tell". On the GT, GT Pro, Rally, and Rally Pro, there is also a  TFT display, cornering anti-lock brake system, and cornering traction control system. The manufacturer's price for the base model is $12,500, for the GT Pro is $16,200, and for the Rally Pro is $16,700.

There are six variants: the base model, GT, GT Low, GT Pro, Rally, and Rally Pro.

Tiger GT
The "street-oriented" GT models (the GT, GT Low and GT Pro) were intended to be "way more of a road bike", and were designed for "urban adventures" including long-distance touring; like the base model, they come with cast wheels. The GT Low (short for "Low Ride Height") has a specialized suspension and lower seat height. ZigWheels called it "beautifully balanced", although not "as adept as the Rally on a trail".

Tiger Rally
The "dirt-oriented" Rally models (the Rally and Rally Pro) were intended to be "way more of an off-road bike"; they come with tubeless spoke wheels. They were described by ZigWheels as "the all terrain conquering variant of Triumph's middleweight adventure series", and a "massive upgrade" over the Tiger 800 XCx. The Rally's seat is  higher than the GT.

See also
List of Triumph motorcycles

References

External links 

 Manufacturer's page

Triumph Motorcycles Ltd motorcycles
Dual-sport motorcycles
Motorcycles introduced in 2020